Tom Hadler (born 30 July 1996) is an English professional footballer who plays as a goalkeeper for Maidstone United.

Early and personal life
Born in Canterbury, Hadler attended the Simon Langton Grammar School for Boys in the city.

Career

Gillingham
Hadler joined the Gillingham youth set up before leaving at the age of 15 "to concentrate on his studies". He re-joined the club on a part-time basis during the 2012–13 season, and turned professional in 2015. He spent loan spells at non-league clubs Folkestone Invicta, Tonbridge Angels, Grays Athletic and Gloucester City, He became the club's second-choice goalkeeper in February 2018, before making his senior debut for Gillingham on 21 April 2018 in a 3–0 home defeat in the league against Blackpool. Despite the result, he was praised by manager Steve Lovell.

He was released by Gillingham at the end of the 2018–19 season, having made only three further appearances for the side, all in the EFL Trophy.

Eastbourne Borough
On 25 June 2019, Hadler signed for Eastbourne Borough who play in the National League South. He made his debut for the side on the opening day of the 2019–20 season in a 1–0 away loss to Billericay Town.

Ebsfleet United
On 16 July 2020 he signed for National League South side Ebbsfleet United.

Maidstone United
In June 2021, Hadler joined Maidstone United of the National League South, winning the league title that year.

Honours
Maidstone United

 National League South: 2021–22

References

1996 births
Living people
English footballers
Footballers from Kent
Gillingham F.C. players
Folkestone Invicta F.C. players
Tonbridge Angels F.C. players
Grays Athletic F.C. players
Gloucester City A.F.C. players
Eastbourne Borough F.C. players
Ebbsfleet United F.C. players
Maidstone United F.C. players
English Football League players
Association football goalkeepers
National League (English football) players